Henricus bibelonus is a species of moth of the family Tortricidae. It is found in Carchi Province, Ecuador.

The wingspan is about 15 mm. The ground colour of the forewings is whitish with sparse pale brownish suffusions and dots. The hindwings are pale brownish grey.

Etymology
The species name refers to the shape of the ventroterminal processes of the aedeagus and is derived from Greek belone (meaning point) and Latin bi (meaning double).

References

Moths described in 2007
Henricus (moth)